The Torch (meaning "love is born from hate") is a 1950 Mexican/American film directed by Emilio Fernández. The film is a remake of Enamorada (1946) and is also known as Bandit General in the United Kingdom.

The original script is based on William Shakespeare's The Taming of the Shrew.

Plot 
The Mexican revolutionary general José Juan Reyes and his men take over the small town of Cholula, Puebla and steal money from the rich men there to fund the revolution. José is a Robin Hood type of vigilante who forces the local businessmen to bend to his will while the townspeople admire him for his cause. José pursues María Peñafiel, the explosive daughter of the richest man in the area. Although she despises José at first, he eventually wins her affection.

Cast

Comic-book adaption 
 Eastern Color Movie Love #4 (August 1950)

References

External links 

1950 films
1950s Spanish-language films
1950s English-language films
English-language Mexican films
Eagle-Lion Films films
American black-and-white films
Mexican black-and-white films
Mexican Revolution films
Films adapted into comics
American remakes of Mexican films
1950s multilingual films
American multilingual films
Mexican multilingual films
Films directed by Emilio Fernández
1950s Mexican films